Kara-Lis Coverdale, also known as K-LC, is a Canadian composer, musician, producer, based in Montreal, Quebec. Coverdale is known equally for her piano, organ, and keyboard work as she is for her experimental electronic projects; often her work integrates the two, blurring the lines between traditional composition and research-based modernism. Her 25 minute album Grafts (2017) was named an album of the year by Noisey, Crack, Boomkat, Resident Advisor, Tinymixtapes, and more.

Biography

Coverdale began studying music and piano at age 5. An improvisational virtuoso at a young age, she had composed and performed her own music before age 10. Her mother is an Estonian visual artist and her father a builder and entrepreneur. She was a competitive pianist until she went to Music school at The University of Western Ontario, where she studied piano, composition, and musicology with Gwen Beamish, Omar Daniel, David Myska, and Jay Hodgson. She later studied in the MIT (Media Information Technologies) program. Canadian pianist Ann Southam presented her with the promising young artist award at The Contemporary Music Showcase in Toronto. At Western Coverdale became captivated by the practice of electroacoustic music and began integrating electronics and digital processes into her work. The Kurzweil K2500 was the first sampler she ever worked with. Her Masters thesis is a study of timbre and realism in recorded music which addresses how "reality" is constructed through sound design and recording technology.

Since age 13, Coverdale has been the organist and music director at several churches across Canada. Sacred music is an influence in her acoustic composition work, as is Estonian choral and folk music. She claims to be a saturationist, and says Napster has been one of her biggest influences.

Tours

Coverdale is known for her live performances that are highly dynamic, powerful and confrontational across a varied spectrum. She has earned praise from Arvo Pärt (she also appears in the documentary "That Pärt Feeling" by Paul Hegeman), Brian Eno, and several other artists. She is one of the only artists to open a solo show for Death Grips, in Köln at Stadtgarden in 2016. In 2018 and 2019, Kara-Lis was a member of the Konoyo Ensemble, in support of Tim Hecker's project of the same name. In 2017 Coverdale partook in the 17th edition of the Sonic Acts Festival in Amsterdam, exploring the theme of The Noise of Being.

Montreal

Coverdale moved to Montreal in 2010, and took a new position as organist at St. John's Estonian Lutheran church in NDG. Since 2011, Coverdale has collaborated live and in studio with electronic composer Tim Hecker, most notably on his 2013 album Virgins. She has also collaborated with the digital information artist LXV (David Sutton). In 2012 she self-released a series of solo piano pieces called Triptych. In 2013 she composed music for Wind Controller called "Conversion Music" which was premiered at LMCML by Montreal clarinetist Suzu Enns. A rework of that piece appears as X4EWI" on Coverdale's 2015 solo album Aftertouches, released by Sacred Phrases in March, 2015. Coverdale is also a frequent collaborator with the writer Kara Crabb.

Notable records

A 480

In 2013 Coverdale released a series of vocal pieces called A 480 that "index the nature of the voice in the age of data." A 480 is accompanied by .nfo scores (an .nfo is a hacker scene release that accompanies a crack), which contain 'information about the sources of the A 480 audio texts, transformation procedures used to arrange and compose them into their present form, and keyword routes of re-creation." She calls them "bad scores" in the sense that they "do not offer performer the clearest instructions to produce an exact re-creation of the composer's authoritative creation... an .nfo score is more like a treasure map than an inclusive set of rules." The virtual chorales of A 480 comprise compositions of actual recorded singers that have been unpersonally sourced, downloaded, then disembodied, disfigured, and displaced over forty times, then arranged into temporally affected four-part fugues. "The pre-composed voices are curationally divided into short loops of different lengths in MAX and played at different speeds across 4 different channels. Slight temporal variations fade in and out over time in constant flux, occasionally pausing for immersion in a pulse chamber before it moves onto another. The length of the looped samples are adjusted one at a time— lengthened and shortened, and at times switched out altogether, to reveal how seemingly minute temporal variations have impactful effects on overarching rhythm, melody, and energy."

Aftertouches

Aftertouches is often described as part of a new school of enterprising electronic artists that lean heavily into electronic adventuring, both conceptually and sonically, "as if to experiment with the very building blocks of musical beauty... to speak a language that not everyone speaks yet" (Adam Harper, The Fader). Compared to its experimentalist contemporaries, Aftertouches approaches experimentalism with a more symphonic calculation and leaning towards composition, weaving both physical and technological realms to creates a series of celestial modern classical miniatures. The Wire describes Aftertouches as "...the textless, fleshless voice-keyboard, the lingering foggy sublime of CPU-washed tone granules, the modular serialism of object oriented processes. The various parts are often starkly separated in colour and harmony, but the overall shape flows on smoothly either still learning from and resolving its experiences, or in thrall to an aesthetic that's beyond the horizon" (The Wire, issue 376, June 2015). For Adhoc, Neil Lord writes "The sweeping moments of beauty are balanced with stabs of electronic grit: an acrylic portrait of a Cronenberg-esque organism, morphing, half human, half machine." Aftertouches was named one of the best 25 records of the first half of 2015 by Adhoc, and was called "a true masterwork from a still young artist" by Bobby Power in Decoder.

Special Projects 
"VoxU" (2017) was premiered at Mutek Montreal and was described by Exclaim to "set the precedent for aspiring experimental artists to come". "PICL," (Creamcake, Berlin, 2017), "Marjamaa Laulud," (Theatre Vanemuine, Tartu ES, 2017) "Shadow Encounter" (Berlin, 2018), "Wood Has Memory" (Issue Project Room, 2018), "Grand Exorcism" (Gesu, Montreal, RBMA, 2018). "UJUV SAUN: for Skarven Sauna" (Oslo, 2019).

Discography

Albums

A 480 (2014, Constellation Tatsu)
Aftertouches (2015, Sacred Phrases)
Sirens (with LXV) (2014, Umor Rex)
Grafts (2017, Boomkat Editions)

EPs
Triptych for Solo Piano (2012, Gate)

Scoring Work
Elektra (2019) by Metahaven.
Royal Jelly (2014) by Kara Crabb. 
The Reproductive Life Cycle of a Flower (2015) by Kara Crabb.

Music in Film
Black Conflux (2019) dir. Nicole Dorsey.

Session, Production, Mixing Work 
Care - How To Dress Well - 2016, Weird World / Domino 
Love Streams - Tim Hecker - 2016, 4ad 
Virgins - Tim Hecker - 2013, Kranky (Keyboards and Piano)
Massacred for Gold - Tim Hecker - 2013, Dir. Jennifer Anderson and Vernon Lott) (Keyboards for Film Score). Patterns of Excel'' - Lee Bannon - 2015, Ninja Tune (Keyboards and Piano, Arrangements)

References

Living people
Canadian electronic musicians
Musicians from Hamilton, Ontario
Musicians from Montreal
Canadian people of Estonian descent
21st-century Canadian composers
Year of birth missing (living people)
Canadian women composers
21st-century Canadian women musicians